Xia Yunyi (1596–1645) was a Ming dynasty poet. He was born in Songjiang (now a district in Shanghai). He was magistrate of Changle County. An opponent of the Qing dynasty, he supported the Southern Ming dynasty. He committed suicide.

References

Poets from Shanghai
Suicides in China
Ming dynasty poets
Ming dynasty magistrates of Changle County
1596 births
1645 deaths